Yttrium(II) oxide or yttrium monoxide is a chemical compound with the formula YO. This chemical compound was first created in its solid form by pulsed laser deposition, using yttrium(III) oxide as the target at 350 °C. The film was deposited on calcium fluoride using a krypton monofluoride laser. This resulted in a 200nm flim of yttrium monoxide.

References

Yttrium compounds
Oxides